Kalakote is a town located in Rajouri district of Jammu region in the Indian union territory of Jammu and Kashmir. Kalakote is noted for its coal mines and has first Thermal Power Plant of North India. There is also a tehsil, sub division, block, municipal committee and constituency with this name and each of these has its headquarters in Kalakot town.

Administration

Tehsil
Kalakote tehsil is one of thirteen tehsils of Rajouri district with headquarters in Kalakote. Head of tehsil is known as tehsildar and Shiv Kumar is current tehsildar of Kalakote. Main aim of tehsil is to look into revenue department over all towns and villages under Kalakote tehsil.

Sub division
Kalakote division is one of five divisions of Rajouri district with headquarters in Kalakote. Head of sub division is commonly known as ADC (Additional Deputy Commissioner) and Krishan Lal is current ADC of Kalakote. Main aim of sub division is to look into administration over all towns and villages under Kalakote tehsil.

Block
Kalakote block is one of nineteen blocks of Rajouri district with headquarters in Kalakote. Head of block is commonly known as BDO (Block Development Officer) and Raj Singh is current BDO of Kalakote. Main aim of block is to look into rural development and infrastructure over all villages under Kalakote tehsil.

Municipal Committee
Kalakote municipality is one of five municipalities of Rajouri district with headquarters in Kalakote. Head of municipality is known as chairman and Vijay Suri is current chairman of Kalakote. Elections for chairmanship and membership conducted after every five year by district administration Rajouri. Main aim of municipality is to look into infrastructure all over Kalakote town.

Constituency
Kalakote constituency is one of four constituency of Rajouri district with headquarters in Kalakote. Head of constituency is known as MLA (Member of Legislative Assembly). After the abrogation of Article 370 of Indian democracy, there is Governor rule in Jammu and Kashmir and henceforth there is no MLA in every constituency in Jammu and Kashmir including Kalakote. Main aim of constituency is to do all over welfare in whole tehsil.

History

Kalakote town
Before independence, Kalakote was a small village with coal mines. In the beginning of the 1950s, a thermal power station was established at Kalakote to utilize the local coal resources. Colonies like Mine Colony and Thermal Colony were established for residence of power plant workers. Shops and hotels were constructed to handle the influx of mine workers. After the commissioning of this project, it was found that the coal available at site was not suitable for the project due to which the project is closed at present. However, coal remains the primary resource of the Tehsil, which is presently being exported outside.

Kalakote tehsil
During 1970's Kalakote and Nowshera are used to be one tehsil with same constituency but it was very difficult to manage both towns by single head because Kalakote was very vast and share boundaries with Kotranka. After that separate tehsil and constituencies were allotted to Kalakote. On 23 March, 2018, an additional Deputy Commissioner was allotted for tehsil Kalakote.

Geography

Kalakote town
Kalakote has a humid subtropical, dry climate. Its yearly temperature is 28.16 °C (82.69 °F) and it is 2.19% higher than India’s averages. It typically receives about 22.15 millimeters (0.87 inches) of precipitation and has 28.48 rainy days (7.8% of the time) annually. Pincode of Kalakote is 185202.

Kalakote tehsil
Kalakote tehsil shares its boundaries with Nowshera in the east, Reasi in the west, Rajouri and Kotranka in the north and Sunderbani and Siot in the south. Kalakote has a humid subtropical, dry climate. Its yearly temperature is 28.16 °C (82.69 °F) and it is 2.19% higher than India’s averages. It typically receives about 22.15 millimeters (0.87 inches) of precipitation and has 28.48 rainy days (7.8% of the time) annually. There are 68 villages and a town in tehsil.

Population

Kalakote town
 India census, the location code of Kalakote is 001514. Kalakote has a total population of 558 peoples, out of which male population is 332 while female population is 226. Literacy rate of kalakote village is 77.96% out of which 82.83% males and 70.80% females are literate. There are about 113 houses in kalakote.

Kalakote tehsil
All the population of Kalakote tehsil lives in urban areas. The total population of the tehsil in 2022 is 93,014.  India census, total population of Kalakote Tehsil is 72,667 of which 37,864 are male and 34,803 are female i.e. sex ratio of 919 females per 1000 of males. The population of children of age 0–6 years is 12768 which is 18% of the total population. There are 6842 male children and 5926 female children between the age 0–6 years. Thus as per the census 2011 the child sex ratio of Kalakote Tehsil is 866 which is less than average sex ratio ( 919 ) of Kalakote Tehsil. Total number of villages in tehsil Kalakote is 69. The literacy rate is 59.13%. Literate people are 35,418 out of 21,123 are male and 14,295 are female. The total working population was 38,661, of which 20,899 are men and 17,762 are women. There total of cultivators is 5,395, with 4,344 men and 1,051 women. 718 people work in agricultural land as a labour in Kalakote, split between 588 men and 130 women.

Religion

Kalakote town
Majority of town population is Hindu. About 93.67% of population is Hindu whereas 4.03% is Sikhism and 2.18% is Muslim. Town has 2 Mandira, one Gurdwara and a Mosque.

Kalakote tehsil
The majority of the tehsil’s population is either Hindu or Muslim. These two religions have 99.63% of population with Muslim population of 51.60% & Hindu population of 48.03%. Other religions like Sikhism & Christianity are followed by 0.37% of the total population.

Education
As of 2022 Kalakote tehsil has one government college, 47 government schools and 19 private schools.

Government Degree College Kalakote is only college of the tehsil.

Some of Good Government Schools are
 Government Higher Secondary School Kalakote
 Government Higher Secondary School Sailsui
 Government Higher Secondary School Solki
Some of Good Private Schools are
 VSK High School Kalakote
 Indira High School Kalakote
 Gian Public School Kalakote

Healthcare
Kalakote town has only one main hospital named CHC Kalakote with three more hospitals under construction in different parts of the tehsil.

Transport
Kalakote is developing tehsil where almost every village is connected through a single-lane road. The Rajouri Katra Highway passes through town which connects Kalakote with Rajouri and Katra along with 14 other villages of the tehsil. A  single-lane road connects Kalakote town with  NH-144A at Siot.

Tourism

Manma Mata Cave
The Manma Mata Temple is a pilgrimage site that lies on Rajouri - Katra highway. This site is devoted to Mata Devi as it is believed that Manma Devi had arrived in this region for meditation purpose. Visitors will find a cave in proximity to this pilgrimage site.

Panjnara Fort
Near Panjnara, a small village in tehsil Kalakote, is a temple locally known as ‘Pandu Kund’. It is a well-preserved temple of the Kashmiri architectural style in Jammu province. The large temple dates back to 9th-10th century A.D and is  similar to Buniyar templend Deltha Mandir in Baramula district. It consists of main shrine, a rectangular peristyle with 55 cells facing to the courtyard and double chambered gateway in the middle of eastern wall.

Tatta Pani

This place is famous for the hot spring whose water is believed to have healing powers. Thousands of people throng the place from June to ending November every year from within and outside the state to take a dip in springs.

Thermal Power Plant Kalakote

In the beginning of 1950s, a Thermal Power Station was established at Kalakote keeping in view the available coal resources. But after commissioning of this project, it was found that the coal available at site was not suitable for the project due to which, the project is closed at present. However, coal is the main resource of the Tehsil, which is presently being exported outside.

Notable people
 Abdul Samad - Indian cricketer

See also 

 Thermal Power Plant Kalakote
 Kalakote Assembly constituency
 Government Degree College, Kalakote

References

Villages in Rajouri district
Tehsils in Rajouri district
Cities and towns in Rajouri district